Brahmachaitanya or Gondavalekar Maharaj (19 February 1845 – 22 December 1913) was an Indian Hindu saint and spiritual master. Brahmachaitanya was a devotee of the Hindu deity Rama and signed his name "Brahmachaitanya Ramdasi". He was a disciple of Tukamai, and advocated for Japa meditation using the 13-character Ram Naam mantra "Shri Ram Jai Ram Jai Jai Ram" to attain enlightenment.

Biography

Early life
Brahmachaitanya Maharaj was born on 19 February 1845.

As a young child, he memorize the way from the Bhagavad Gita and bestowed upon him the title of "Brahmachaitanya." He reportedly attained enlightenment at the age of 5.

Initiation
He arrived in Yehalegaon, a village near Nanded, and met Tukamai, considered a living synthesis of Jnana Yoga, Bhakti Yoga, and Karma Yoga. Ganpati stayed with Tukamai for nine months and followed his instructions. On Ram Navami, Tukamai initiated Ganapati with the mantra "Śrī Rām Jai Rām Jai Jai Rām" ("श्री राम जय राम जय जय राम"), and bestowed upon him the title of "Brahmachaitanya." He reportedly attained enlightenment at the age of 5.

Family life
Brahmachaitanya later traveled across India to Ujjain, the Himalayas, Ayodhya, Varanasi, Calcutta, Indore, and Nashik. In March 1866 Brahmachaitanya returned to Gondavale and accepted gṛhastha. Saraswati and his son died prematurely, and he remarried the daughter of Deshpande of Atpadi. His second wife was blind from birth and later became known as Aaisaheb. Having given up all their belongings, Brahmachaitanya took his mother, Gitabai, on a pilgrimage to Varanasi and then Ayodhya. She died in Varanasi.

Return to Gondavale
In later years, Brahmachaitanya continued to expound spiritual methods revolving around devotion to Rama. Initially, he had a Rama temple built as an extension of his residence.

With time, the number of his disciples and followers increased. To cater to an increasing number of devotees, he arranged for the construction of Rama, Dattatreya, and Shani temples with an accommodation facility at Gondavale. He also had Rama temples built in other rural regions of Maharashtra.

Final years
Brahmachaitanya died on 22 December 1913, in Gondavale.

Philosophy
Brahmachaitanya was a proponent of Bhakti Yoga. His teachings were aligned with Samarth Ramdas. The Ram Nam mantra, originally attributed to Ramdas, was adopted by Brahmachaitanya, and was central to his teachings. According to S. G. Tulpule, Brahmachaitanya, like Mirabai, Ramdas, Chaitanya Mahaprabhu, and Tulsidas, was a great practitioner of reciting the divine name as an incarnation of God.

Brahmachaitanya frequently used pravachan and bhajan to engage people along the path of devotion. He encouraged cow protection and food donation. He was also one of the key figures in the revival of Vedic ritualism (vaidik anuṣṭhān) in Maharashtra.

Teachings
Bramhachaitanya advised seekers that one can achieve God through spiritual practices. The two proven ways for the worldly people to be able to attain eternal bliss with the purity of heart are सत्संगती (company of saints) and नाम (chanting the name of God). Brahmachaitanya spent his lifetime teaching the importance of Naam Japa.

He advocated the continued remembrance of God through Naam Japa as a means to happiness, contentment and peace.

Brahmachaitanya's teachings are summarized in his subodh (sound advice), which is recited in Gondavale and by his followers across the world.

Subodh teachings include:

 Chant the name of God and share the importance of chanting with everyone you meet.
 Naam alone is the ultimate truth.
 Naam is the means and the end.
 Be soaked in the blissful chanting while enjoying worldly pleasures.
 Be happy and stay away from laziness, fear, and hate.
 Always be mindful of the divine presence in life.
 Be polite and nice to people and perform bhakti with complete devotion.
 Purity in thought and action is recommended and refrain from hypocrisy.
 Consider Ram as your friend, guide and master and surrender to him wholeheartedly.
 Give your 100% to everything you do and leave the results of your effort to Ram, thereby dropping the doer ship entirely. 
 Control your desires and be righteous in your behavior.
 Ram is the giver of happiness, and one should consider performing worldly duties as a way to serve Him.
 Sing and chant His name and always be content and at peace even if you lose all the worldly belongings.
 Pride is the biggest enemy of a seeker, be alert and do not give in to your ego.
 Ram resides in our hearts. He is the epitome of love and yearns for love from all his followers.

The daily discourses of Bramhachaitanya have been compiled into 'Pravachane' book of discourses.

Noted disciples and followers

Shri K. V. Belsare
Shri K. V. Belsare, affectionately known as "Baba" (father), was born in a highly educated family in Hyderabad in 1909. He mastered the scriptures such as the Bhagavad Gita, Dasbodh and Dnyaneshwari, at an early age and is believed to have memorized all of the 700 shlokas of the Bhagavad Gita in one week. He later became a professor of philosophy at Siddhartha college in Mumbai. His lectures were so popular that students from other disciplines used to line up and the classrooms were often overflowing due to his extraordinary clarity and ability to teach complex subjects in an easy-to-understand manner. He was initiated by Brahmachaitanya in 1931. On Brahmachaitanya's orders, Baba became the cornerstone of propagating Maharaj's teachings to a vast population over 60 years through many discourses on topics ranging from meditation to lectures on the Dnyaneshwari and Dasbodh. He authored more than 50 books in Marathi. His notable books include the biography of Brahmachaitanya, Upanishdacha Abhyas (studies on Upanishads) and Bhavarthgatha.

D.R. Bendre
D.R. Bendre (1896 – 1981) was a Kannada poet and recipient of the Jnanpith Award. Bendre credited Brahmachaitanya for bestowing on him the gift of poetry.

Worship

Temples

Brahmachaitanya and his followers built and consecrated many temples around India. There are also temples dedicated to Brahmachaitanya in Maharashtra as well as in other places in India such as Bangalore (Srinivasanagar), and Hebbali in Dharwad district. The Ram Nam Japa ritual is held on a daily basis in these temples.

In literature
Sri Brahmachaitanya Gondavalekar Maharaj – biography by K.V. Belsare

References

External links
 Pravachane of Shree Maharaj
 Official website of Gondavalekar Maharaj

1845 births
1913 deaths
19th-century Hindu religious leaders
20th-century Hindu religious leaders
Bhakti movement
Marathi Hindu saints
Meditation
People from Satara district
Rama
Sant Mat
Vedanta